The principal secretary to the president of Pakistan is the administrative head of Aiwan-e-Sadr. The position was considered to be a very important one until 2010 as after the Eighteenth Amendment, the presidency was reduced to a mere ceremonial position. The position holder usually belongs to the Pakistan Administrative Service. The current principal secretary to the president is Mr Waqar Ahmad from Secretariat Group. He is holding this position since 5th February 2022.

The longest-serving principal secretary to the president was ace bureaucrat Qudrat Ullah Shahab, who served with three heads of state.

See also
Principal Secretary to the Prime Minister of Pakistan
Government of Pakistan
Federal Secretary
Interior Secretary of Pakistan
Cabinet Secretary of Pakistan

References

Federal government ministries of Pakistan